The World Methodist Peace Award is a peace award. It was established by Dr. Stanley Leyland at the 1976 13th World Methodist Conference in Dublin and is awarded by the World Methodist Council.

Recipients

1970s 
 1977: Saidie Patterson, Northern Ireland
 1978: Anwar Sadat, Egypt

1980s 
 1980: Abel Hendricks, South Africa
 1981: Donald Soper, Baron Soper, Great Britain
 1983: Kenneth Mew, Zimbabwe
 1984: Tai-Young Lee, Korea
 1985: Jimmy Carter, USA
 1986: Sir Alan Walker and Lady Winifred Walker, Australia
 1987: Bert Bissell and Woodrow Bradley Seals, UK and USA
 1988: Gordon Wilson, Northern Ireland

1990s 
 1990: Mikhail Gorbachev, USSR
 1991: Bärbel Bohley, Germany
 1992: Zdravko Beslov
 1994: Bishop Elias Chacour, Palestine
 1996: Stanley Mogoba, South Africa
 1997: Community of Sant'Egidio, Italy
 1998: Kofi Annan, Ghana
 1999: Grandmothers of the Plaza de Mayo, Argentina

2000s 
 2000: Nelson Mandela, South Africa
 2001: Evangelist Joseph Rice Hale, USA
 2002: Boris Trajkovski, Macedonia
 2003: Casimira Rodríguez, Bolivia
 2004: Millard Fuller and Habitat for Humanity, USA
 2005: Bishop Lawi Imathiu, Kenya
 2006: Sunday Mbang
 2007: Harold Good
 2008: Helen Prejean, USA
 2009: Jeannine Brabon

2010s 
 2011: Rosalind Colwill
 2012: Joy Balazo, The Philippines
 2015: Dr. Hugh and Shirliann "Fritzi" Johnson, for work in Algeria

References

External links
Official site

Methodism
Peace awards
Awards established in 1976